Jean-Marc Djian (born 29 March 1966) is a French former ice hockey goaltender. He competed in the men's tournaments at the 1988 Winter Olympics and the 1992 Winter Olympics.

References

1966 births
Living people
Brûleurs de Loups players
Olympic ice hockey players of France
Ice hockey players at the 1988 Winter Olympics
Ice hockey players at the 1992 Winter Olympics
Sportspeople from La Tronche